The Commer FC was a forward control commercial vehicle produced by Commer from 1960 to 1976. During its lifespan, it was developed into the Commer PB in 1967, and the Commer SpaceVan in 1974. After the Rootes Group, which owned Commer, was purchased by Chrysler, the SpaceVan was also sold under the Dodge, DeSoto and Fargo marques. From 1976 onwards, the van was only sold as the Dodge SpaceVan, and it remained in production until 1983.

History 

Commer became known in later years as a maker of vans for the British Post Office—particularly the Commer FC which was introduced in 1960 with many body styles, including a  van. After engine and interior upgrades it was renamed the PB in 1967 and the SpaceVan in 1974. Following the merger of Rootes Group with Chrysler to form Chrysler Europe, the SpaceVan was sold as a Dodge and Fargo model until 1976, when both Commer and Fargo names were dropped. These were rounded-front forward-control vans with narrow front track—a legacy of their Humber car-derived suspension. Utilising at first the Hillman-derived  four-cylinder engine in the PA series, then the larger , and from 1968 onwards the  unit in the PB, only the cast-iron-head version of this engine were used. A Perkins 4108 diesel was also available.

The "1725 cc engine" (as it is known; it actually displaces ) was available in the 1970s with a Borg Warner (BW) Model 35 three-speed automatic transmission with a dashboard-mounted selector. This was not a popular option and few were built.

The four-speed gearbox on manual transmission models was based on those fitted to contemporary Hillman Minx (of the "Audax" generation) and later Rootes Arrow series cars such as the Hillman Hunter.

An unusual feature of the model was that the handbrake operated on the front drum brakes.

One of the reasons that the van was less popular with fleet operators than the Bedford and Ford Transit models it sold against was that, as on the BMC J2 and J4 models the forward-control design restricted access to the engine and made engine changes labour-intensive; the only way to remove the engine without dropping the suspension subframe was to crane the engine out through the passenger door. However, the testers reported that at  the van was "plainly at its absolute limit, screaming away in a most distressing fashion"; readers were advised to view  as a more realistic absolute maximum.

Reportedly, one condition of the government bailout of Chrysler's British operations in 1976 was a commitment to upgrade the Spacevan, which was praised for its brakes, cornering, and price, but criticized for its power, comforts, and top speed. A revised Spacevan was thus introduced in 1977, using the same mechanicals but with numerous cosmetic changes, conveniences, and a new interior. Although outdated by its demise in 1982, by which time Commer had been taken over by Peugeot, the Spacevan remained a familiar sight in the UK thanks to its role with Post Office Telephones – which was almost solely responsible for it remaining in production for so long and these vans and outstanding orders were inherited by British Telecom on its formation in October 1981. The last Spacevan was built in 1983.

Under PSA's management, the Dodge SpaceVan was succeded by a rebadged version of the Peugeot J5 (itself a rebadged Fiat Ducato) called the "Talbot Express"; it was only available for the UK market. On the other hand, Renault Trucks (who had bought the truck division of Chrysler Europe) offered the Dodge 50 series as the successor to the SpaceVan, being available as both a van, chassis cab and pickup - thus offering a wider variety of body styles than the Talbot Express. Nevertheless, the 50 series range was significantly bigger and heavier than the SpaceVan.

In contrary to its rivals, which had dissapeared from everyday streetscape during the previous years, the Dodge SpaceVan remained a familiar sight on British roads up until the mid-1990s.

New Zealand production 

This van was produced in New Zealand by Todd Motors at their Petone Factory. It was last produced in 1974 in their secondary body factory on the other side to the railway tracks from the main car assembly plant. They produced a standard panel van, a mini bus body with sliding side windows, and cab and chassis models. The seats for the mini bus were produced by other coach builders. They used the high compression steel head motors; not the alloy head Hillman Hunter units.

Generally, one unit was produced in the morning and another unit in the afternoon; i.e. 10 units per week, a third unit could be produced each day when sales were higher.

See also
 Ford Thames 400E – similarly-sized vans from the same period
 Morris Commercial J4

References 

FC
Vans
Vehicles introduced in 1960
1970s cars
1980s cars